In the run up to the 2019 Estonian parliamentary election, various organisations carry out opinion polling to gauge voting intention in Estonia. Results of such polls are displayed in this article.

The date range for these opinion polls are from the previous general election, held on 22 September 2015, to the 26–28 February 2019.

Poll results are listed in the table below in reverse chronological order, showing the most recent first. The highest percentage figure in each poll is displayed in bold, and the background shaded in the leading party's color. In the instance that there is a tie, then no figure is shaded.

Graphical Summary

Polling Results

2019

2018

2017

2016

2015

References

Opinion polling in Estonia